Crime Scene is a South Korean variety program with Hong Jin-ho, Park Ji-yoon, NS Yoon-G, Jun Hyun-moo, Lim Bang-geul, and Kang Yong-suk as the cast for the first season. The first season consists of 10 episodes and aired on JTBC from May 10 to July 12, 2014.

Hong Jin-ho and Park Ji-yoon returned for the second season. Together with new members Jang Jin, Jang Dong-min and Hani, the five of them formed the cast for the second season. The second season was aired on Wednesdays at 23:00 (KST) from April 1 to June 24, 2015.

A third season began airing on April 28, 2017, with a preview episode a week earlier. It features returning cast members, Park Ji-yoon and Jang Jin, as well as newcomers, Kim Ji-hoon, Yang Se-hyung and Jung Eun-ji. The season ended on July 14, 2017.

Format

Season 1
At the start of the game, the players (both recurring cast members and guests) are introduced to the "Crime Scene", which is a mockup of a murder scene replicated on a stage area, and are tasked with figuring out who the murderer is.

 Case Briefing: Upon discovering the crime scene, the players are given the "case briefing", which includes a summary of events that occurred before the murder and a list of the possible suspects. Immediately afterwards, each player chooses a suspect to roleplay as for the remainder of the game. The players are then given more detailed information about the suspect they are respectively portraying, including the suspect's personality, whereabouts during the crime, relationship to the other suspects, and (in the case of the murderer) evidence that can be used against them. The rest of the investigation is split up into several segments:
 Alibi: Each player introduces themselves as the suspect they are portraying, gives some background information about their relationship with the victim, and describes their whereabouts before and during the crime. The criminal must lie about this while the others must tell the truth. The other players are allowed to ask questions during this time but the player currently giving their alibi is not required to respond.
 On-Site Investigation: Each player is given ten minutes to investigate the crime scene for clues. To aid the players in remembering clues they deem important, they are also each given a camera that can take up to ten pictures. For the first two cases this segment was run individually, however from the third case onward this segment was run in pairs.
 5-Minute Briefing or Free Briefing:
 5-Minute Briefing: After everyone has finished the On-Site Investigation, each player has five minutes to present any evidence they may have found or theories that they are currently considering. To help present their point, a dry-erase board and marker are provided. They are also allowed to ask the other players questions concerning evidence, however the clock will not pause for questions. Additionally, only the player currently giving the briefing is allowed to ask any questions.
 Free Briefing: Similar to the 5-Minute Briefing, except for the fact that no time limit is imposed on the players and everyone is allowed to ask questions.
 First Criminal Vote: Normally presented after the briefing, each player secretly votes for who they currently think is the criminal. The overall results are then revealed to all of the players to use during the following discussion.
 Free Talk: The players are seated in a circle and allowed to freely discuss the case in order to come to a consensus on the murderer. The players may only use evidence collected thus far, and are not allowed to return to the crime scene during this segment. They are also given hints over the course of the segment to aid in their discussion.
 Hints: Two additional clues pointing to the murderer are given to the players during Free Talk. These hints can range from autopsy reports, to the personal belongings of the suspects, to a CCTV recording from  the day of the murder.
 Additional On-Site Investigation: All the players gather at the crime scene for additional investigation and discussion. This segment is normally when the players investigate areas they missed during the initial On-Site Investigation and explore theories discussed during Free Talk. This segment is run at the same time as the 1-on-1 Interrogation.
 1-on-1 Interrogation: At some point during the Additional On-Site Investigation, each player heads to the interrogation room and calls another player in order to have a one on one discussion with them. Once called, the summoned player must leave the crime scene immediately and head to the interrogation room. Once the summoned player arrives the players are given 3 minutes for any discussion they would like to have. Although it is generally expected that the three minutes are used to interrogate the summoned player, this time has also been used for private collaboration. Players can be summoned more than once and consequently may lose precious time that could have been used to further investigate the crime scene.
 Final Criminal Vote: After all of the players have had their 1-on-1 Interrogation, the game goes to the final vote. At this point, any additional investigation is prohibited, though the players are still free to discuss amongst themselves. Each player then secretly votes for who they think is the final criminal, and the result of these votes determine the outcome of the game.
Results: After the Final Criminal Vote, the player who receives the most votes is "arrested" and locked in a makeshift prison, and the players who voted for that person are revealed. If the arrested player is the criminal, everyone who voted for that player receives a bag of gold coins. However, if the arrested player is not the criminal, the actual criminal wins all of the gold coins that the other players would have won.

Season 2
Slight changes were made to the format in Season 2.
 Addition of "Detective" Role: In every case one of the players is now assigned the "detective" role. The detective is always innocent and therefore can serve as a trusted ally to the other players. Additionally, the detective is given two votes instead of one, and is allowed to either split them or vote for the same suspect twice. Finally, the detective is now the only player who can request a 1-on-1 Interrogation.
 Prize Distribution Change: Instead of a bag of gold coins, each player receives ₩1,000,000 (appx. US$1,000) for correctly guessing the criminal (the detective receives twice as much if they use both of their votes on the same suspect). As in Season 1, if the criminal is not arrested, the criminal takes all of the winnings instead. Once the season is over, only the top 3 players get to keep their earnings (all of the guests are treated as a single player for this purpose).

Season 3
The format has stayed relatively the same since the beginning, however minor changes have been added in Season 3.
 Detective's Assistant: In Season 2, the detective's assistant was a crew member who helped deliver hints to the cast, as well as bring suspects in at the start of the episode and escort them to 1-on-1 Interrogations with the detective. The detective's assistant now has a larger role in Season 3. Additionally, he now sits in the Briefing where the players discuss evidence, and the detective can consult with him before their first criminal vote. The detective's assistant is played by actor Kim Min-Gue in Season 3.
 On-Site Investigation: Players are now allowed 15 minutes to survey the crime scene and look for evidence.

Cast

Season 1

Season 2

Season 3

Episodes

Season 1

Season 2

Crime Scene 2 Awards

Season 3

Crime Scene 3 Awards

Ratings
As most Korean cable programs rarely reach 1 percent, these ratings are considered a huge success.

Season 2

Season 3

International versions

Mango TV purchased the rights for a Chinese adaptation of the show, titled Who's the Murderer (明星大侦探), which premiered on March 27, 2016.

References

External links
Season 1 Official Website 
Season 2 Official Website 
Season 3 Official Website 

2014 South Korean television series debuts
2017 South Korean television series endings
Korean-language television shows
JTBC original programming
South Korean variety television shows